Tajan Gukeh (also Romanized as Tajan Gūkeh and Tajen Gūkēh; also known as Tajan Gū’eh-ye Bālā and Teshenguke) is a village in Kisom Rural District, in the Central District of Astaneh-ye Ashrafiyeh County, Gilan Province, Iran. At the 2006 census, its population was 2,186, in 663 families.

References 

Populated places in Astaneh-ye Ashrafiyeh County